State Route 11 was the previous designation for the following routes in Nevada:
State Route 225
State Route 226
State Route 229
Several unimproved roads from Elko to Owyhee via Tuscaroa, Jack Creek, Deep Creek and Whiterock.

011